Sofoklis Venizelos (also transliterated as Sophocles Venizelos) (3 November 1894 – 7 February 1964) was a Greek politician, who three times served as Prime Minister of Greece – in 1944 (in exile), 1950 and 1950–1951.

Life and career

Venizelos was born on 3 November 1894 in Chania, in Crete (then a part of the Ottoman Empire; became an autonomous state under Ottoman suzerainty and the protection of Russia, Britain, France and Italy in 1898). He was the second-born son of the politician Eleftherios Venizelos.

During World War I he served with distinction in the Greek Army and in the initial phases of the Asia Minor campaign, reaching the rank of Captain of Infantry.

He resigned from the Army and was elected as an MP with his father's Liberal Party in the 1920 elections.

In 1941, after the Axis occupation of Greece, he became ambassador to the United States, representing the  Greek government in exile based in Cairo. He became a minister of that government in 1943 under Prime Minister Emmanuel Tsuderos, and briefly its Prime Minister in 1944 (April 13–26).

After the end of the war, he returned to Greece; where he became Vice President of the Liberal Party (led by Themistoklis Sofoulis) and a minister in the first post-war government led by Georgios Papandreou.

In 1948 he assumed the leadership of the party and became a minister in a number of short-lived liberal governments led by Papandreou and Nikolaos Plastiras; he was also the Prime Minister of three such governments.

In 1954 his longtime friendship with Georgios Papandreou was shaken, and he formed the rival  coalition.

The rift was bridged in 1958, and in 1961 he became a founding member of Papandreou's Center Union party, which he served until his death in 1964.

Venizelos died on the passenger ship Hellas in the Aegean Sea, en route from Chania to Piraeus. His grave lies next to his father's on the island of Crete. His wife Kathleen died in 1983 aged 86.

Bridge

Venizelos was a contract bridge player "of international stature" during the 1930s, as a voluntary exile in France. He played for France in the European IBL Championships (later incorporated in the history of present-day European Bridge League championships). France won the 1935 tournament and a version of the team traveled to New York City late that year for a match against the Four Aces, "an unofficial world championship match" that the Aces won.

Venizelos was second in skill to Pierre Albarran among contemporary French players, according to Alan Truscott. Beside the national teams at contract bridge, they both played on a 1933 team that hosted an American foursome led by Ely Culbertson in a long match at "plafond, the French parent of contract bridge, which differed only in the scoring details." The two teams played 102 deals to a draw; Albarran and Venizelos cooperated on a book reporting and analysing the match:
 Les 102 donnes d'un grand match, by Pierre Albarran, Adrien Aron, and Venizelos, preface by Ely Culbertson (Éditions Grasset, 1933), 188 pp., 

Albarran, Aron, and Venizelos were three of six players on the 1935 European champion team.

Venizelos/Mitsotakis family tree

Notes

References

External links
 
 

1894 births
1964 deaths
20th-century prime ministers of Greece
Politicians from Chania
People from Ottoman Crete
Liberal Party (Greece) politicians
National Political Union (1946) politicians
Liberal Democratic Union (Greece) politicians
Centre Union politicians
Prime Ministers of Greece
Foreign ministers of Greece
Ministers of National Defence of Greece
Greek MPs 1946–1950
Greek MPs 1950–1951
Greek MPs 1951–1952
Greek MPs 1952–1956
Greek MPs 1956–1958
Ambassadors of Greece to the United States
Sofoklis
Military personnel from Chania
Greek people of World War II
Greek military personnel of the Greco-Turkish War (1919–1922)
Greek military personnel of World War I
Greek anti-communists
French contract bridge players
1950s in Greek politics
Children of national leaders
Deaths in the Aegean Sea
Sofoklis